Nanafalia is an unincorporated community and census-designated place (CDP) in Marengo County, Alabama, United States. As of the 2020 census, its population was 75, down from 94 at the 2010 census. The community is located on a ridge above the Tombigbee River, and the name is derived from the Choctaw words for long hill. Nanafalia has a post office with a zip code of 36764.

Geography
Nanafalia is in southwestern Marengo County, along Alabama State Route 10. State Route 69 forms the western border of the CDP.

The community is on a flat-topped ridge which drains north to South Double Creek and south to an unnamed tributary of Horse Creek. Both named creeks flow west to the Tombigbee River.

Demographics

As of the 2010 United States Census, there were 94 people living in the CDP. The racial makeup of the CDP was 57.4% White, 40.4% Black and 2.1% from two or more races.

Notable person
 Walter Pettus Gewin, former federal judge
 Chris Landrum, American football linebacker, Los Angeles Chargers

References

Census-designated places in Alabama
Census-designated places in Marengo County, Alabama
Unincorporated communities in Alabama
Unincorporated communities in Marengo County, Alabama
Alabama placenames of Native American origin